This article provides information on candidates who stood for the 1917 Australian federal election. The election was held on 5 May 1917.

Many Labor members had merged with the Commonwealth Liberal Party to form the Nationalist Party. Seats held by the Liberal Party are considered to be held by the Nationalist Party. The seats held by Labor defectors are considered to be held by Labor.

By-elections, appointments and defections

By-elections and appointments
On 6 February 1915, Alfred Hampson (Labor) was elected to succeed John Arthur (Labor) as the member for Bendigo.
On 20 February 1915, Carty Salmon (Liberal) was elected to succeed Edward Jolley (Labor) as the member for Grampians.
On 6 May 1915, William Mahony (Labor) was elected unopposed to succeed Robert Howe (Labor) as the member for Dalley.
On 11 December 1915, Edward Corser (Liberal) was elected to succeed Andrew Fisher (Labor) as the member for Wide Bay.
On 1 March 1917, John Earle (Nationalist) was appointed as a Tasmanian Senator to replace Rudolph Ready (Labor).
Subsequent to the election, but prior to the new Senate being sworn in:
On 24 May 1917, James Rowell (Nationalist) was appointed as a South Australian Senator to replace William Story (Nationalist).

Defections
In November 1916, pro-conscription Labor members left the party to form the National Labor Party under the leadership of Labor Prime Minister Billy Hughes (West Sydney). Hughes was joined by MPs William Archibald (Hindmarsh), Fred Bamford (Herbert), Reginald Burchell (Fremantle), Ernest Carr (Macquarie), John Chanter (Riverina), George Dankel (Boothby), Jens Jensen (Bass), William Laird Smith (Denison), John Lynch (Werriwa), Alexander Poynton (Grey), William Spence (Darling), Josiah Thomas (Barrier) and William Webster (Gwydir). In the Senate, the party was joined by Victorian Senator Edward Russell; Queensland Senator Thomas Givens; Western Australian Senators Richard Buzacott, George Henderson, Hugh de Largie, Patrick Lynch and George Pearce; and South Australian Senators Robert Guthrie, John Newland, William Senior and William Story.
In early 1917, Prime Minister Billy Hughes negotiated a merger of his National Labor Party with Joseph Cook's Liberal Party. The resulting Nationalist Party (Australia) was joined by all National Labor and Liberal members, as well as Independent MP George Wise (Gippsland).

Seat changes
A number of the ex-Labor Nationalists moved to new seats, as their old seats were unwinnable for conservative candidates.
The member for Barrier (NSW), Josiah Thomas, contested the Senate.
The member for West Sydney (NSW), Prime Minister Billy Hughes, contested the Victorian seat of Bendigo.
South Australian Senator William Story contested Boothby.

Retiring Members and Senators

Nationalist
 George Dankel MP (Boothby, SA) [elected as Labor]
 Robert Patten MP (Hume, NSW)
 Jacob Stumm MP (Lilley, Qld)
Senator Sir Albert Gould (NSW)

House of Representatives
Sitting members at the time of the election are shown in bold text. Successful candidates are highlighted in the relevant colour. Where there is possible confusion, an asterisk (*) is also used.

New South Wales

Queensland

South Australia

Tasmania

Victoria

Western Australia

Senate
Sitting Senators are shown in bold text. Tickets that elected at least one Senator are highlighted in the relevant colour. Successful candidates are identified by an asterisk (*).

New South Wales
Three seats were up for election. The Labor Party was defending one seat. The Nationalist Party was defending two seats. Labor Senators Albert Gardiner, John Grant and Allan McDougall were not up for re-election.

Queensland
Three seats were up for election. The Labor Party was defending three seats. Labor Senators Myles Ferricks and William Ryott Maughan and Nationalist Senator Thomas Givens were not up for re-election.

South Australia
Three seats were up for election. The Labor Party was defending two seats. The Nationalist Party was defending one seat. Labor Senator James O'Loghlin and Nationalist Senators John Newland and John Shannon were not up for re-election.

Tasmania
Three seats were up for election. The Nationalist Party was defending three seats. Labor Senators James Guy, James Long and David O'Keefe were not up for re-election.

Victoria
Three seats were up for election. The Labor Party was defending three seats. Labor Senators Stephen Barker and John Barnes and Nationalist Senator Edward Russell were not up for re-election.

Western Australia
Three seats were up for election. The Labor Party was defending three seats. Labor Senator Ted Needham and Nationalist Senators Patrick Lynch and George Pearce were not up for re-election.

See also
 1917 Australian federal election
 Members of the Australian House of Representatives, 1914–1917
 Members of the Australian House of Representatives, 1917–1919
 Members of the Australian Senate, 1914–1917
 Members of the Australian Senate, 1917–1920
 List of political parties in Australia

References
Adam Carr's Election Archive - House of Representatives 1917
Adam Carr's Election Archive - Senate 1917

1917 in Australia
Candidates for Australian federal elections